Olof Mattias Jonsson (born 16 January 1974) is a Swedish former professional footballer who played as a winger. Starting off his career with Örebro SK in the early 1990s, he went on to represent Helsingborgs IF, Brøndby IF, and Norwich City before retiring at Djurgårdens IF in 2011. A full international between 1996 and 2006, he won 57 caps and scored nine goals for the Sweden national team. He represented his country at the 2002 FIFA World Cup, UEFA Euro 2004, and the 2006 FIFA World Cup.

Club career

Early career 
Born in Kumla, Jonson started playing youth football with IFK Kumla and Karlslunds IF. He moved to Örebro SK in 1992, where he got his senior debut in the top-flight Allsvenskan championship. He moved to league rivals Helsingborgs IF in 1996. He won the 1999 Allsvenskan championship with Helsingborg, before leaving the club at the end of the 1999 season.

Brøndby IF 
Jonson moved abroad to join Danish club Brøndby IF in the Danish Superliga championship. He was brought in by Brøndby's new manager Åge Hareide, and Jonson played several games as a striker, before settling as a left-sided winger. He showed his goalscoring abilities for Brøndby on a number of occasions. In the 2001–02 UEFA Cup tournament, Brøndby had lost 3–1 away to Croatian club NK Varteks. In the return game, Jonson scored a hat-trick which guided Brøndby to a 5–0 victory and advancement in the tournament, on a 6–3 aggregate. Jonson also scored a hat-trick in an April 2002 Superliga game, when Brøndby won 5–0 against Akademisk Boldklub, and helped the club win the 2001–02 Superliga championship.

He was Brøndby's league topscorer with 11 goals in the 2002–03 Superliga season, and helped the club win the 2003 Danish Cup trophy.

Norwich City 
After the 2004 European Championship, Jonson looked to leave Brøndby. In August 2004, he moved to England and joined the newly promoted Premier League side Norwich City. He transferred from Brøndby for an undisclosed fee, which was believed to be around £850,000. He struggled to make an impact in the Premier League, and left Norwich after one season.

Return to Sweden 
In 2005, he returned to Sweden to play for Djurgårdens IF. In his first season with the club, he helped Djurgårdens IF win the Double of both the 2005 Allsvenskan and Svenska Cupen trophies. He started the tournament as a substitute, but was included in Sweden's starting line-up for the final two games before elimination. He ended his national team career in August 2006. Jonson ended his career after the 2011 season, and played his last game on 23 October 2011.

International career 
Jonson made his Sweden national team debut in February 1996. He was included in the Sweden national team for the 2002 World Cup, where he took part in two games as a substitute, before Sweden were eliminated.

He was called-up in the Sweden national team for the 2004 European Championship. He started the tournament on the bench, but was brought on as a substitute and eventually secured himself a place in the starting line-up. He played in three of Sweden's four games, and scored a goal against Denmark, which secured Sweden advancement from the preliminary group stage.

He represented Sweden at the 2006 World Cup, where he took part in all Sweden's four matches.

Personal life 
He is the father of the Djurgårdens IF player Melker Jonsson.

Career statistics

Club

International

Scores and results list Sweden's goal tally first, score column indicates score after each Jonson goal.

Honours 
 Helsingborgs IF
 Allsvenskan: 1999

 Brøndby IF
 Danish Superliga: 2001–02
 Danish Cup: 2002–03

 Djurgårdens IF
 Allsvenskan: 2005
 Svenska Cupen: 2005

Individual

 Stor Grabb: 2001

 Årets Järnkamin: 2011

References

External links
 
 
Career information at ex-canaries.co.uk

 

1974 births
Living people
Expatriate men's footballers in Denmark
Expatriate footballers in England
Swedish footballers
Sweden international footballers
Swedish expatriate footballers
Helsingborgs IF players
Örebro SK players
Brøndby IF players
Norwich City F.C. players
Djurgårdens IF Fotboll players
Allsvenskan players
Danish Superliga players
Premier League players
UEFA Euro 2004 players
2002 FIFA World Cup players
2006 FIFA World Cup players
Association football midfielders
Swedish expatriate sportspeople in Denmark
Swedish expatriate sportspeople in England
People from Kumla Municipality
Sweden under-21 international footballers
Sportspeople from Örebro County